Half Day is a former unincorporated town in Lake County, Illinois, in the state's northeastern region.

The town was forcibly annexed by the village of Vernon Hills in 1993. The following month, the village of Lincolnshire also attempted to annex a portion of Half Day.  The two villages entered a legal battle, filing lawsuits against each other.  Eventually, this resulted in the Vernon Hills annexation being approved and Lincolnshire's being denied.

Parts of area infrastructure are still named for the original unincorporated community. The portion of Illinois Route 22 that passes through is named Half Day Road. Half Day School, originally established in 1839 and temporarily closed in the early 1980s after declining enrollment, was modernized and reopened in 1992; it currently serves third-, fourth-, and fifth-grade students and is part of Lincolnshire-Prairie View School District 103.

Half Day appeared in a news article in 1952 when then Illinois Governor Adlai Stevenson flew there to vote in the presidential election (Stevenson was a candidate the same year).

Nomenclature
Many people believe that it was named Half Day because it was regarded that Half Day was a half day's distance from Chicago by horse and carriage. In reality, a horse and carriage could make it to Chicago in a half day but some believe the area was actually named after Potawatomi Chief Aptakisic, the chief at the time the area was settled. The name was anglicized as "Half Day" or "Hefda" and a cartographer spelled it "Half Day", and the misnomer stuck, giving rise to the reputed, but erroneous, derivation of the name.

References 

Vernon Hills, Illinois
Populated places in Lake County, Illinois
Neighborhoods in Illinois
Populated places established in 1839